Marie Violay (born 1984) is a French expert in rock mechanics. She is an Assistant Professor and the head of the Laboratory of Experimental Rock Mechanics at EPFL (École Polytechnique Fédérale de Lausanne). She teaches rocks mechanics, geophysics for engineers and geology.

Career and research 
Violay completed her PhD at the Geoscience faculty of the Montpellier University in 2010 with her thesis "High enthalpy hydro-geothermal reservoirs : insights from basalt petrophysical properties" (Réservoirs hydro-géothermaux haute enthalpie : apport des propriétés pétrophysiques des basaltes). She then was a research assistant at National Institute of Geophysics and Volcanology in Rome and at ETH Zurich.

In 2015 she was appointed Assistant Professor and head of the Laboratory of Experimental Rock Mechanics at EPFL and was awarded one of the seven Energy grant of the SNSF (Swiss National Science Foundation). These grants are aimed at promoting young scientists in the field of energy research.

In 2017, Violay was awarded the ERC Starting Grant in the area of Earth System Science (Physical Sciences and Engineering domain). The grants are awarded under the "excellent science" pillar of Horizon 2020.

The focus of Violay’s research is to better understand the mechanical and physical processes in the first kilometers of the earth’s crust. She brings better understanding on how fluids and rocks interact at these depths, which is crucial for the development of deep geothermal energy production. Understanding earthquake nucleation and propagation are other focuses of her work. She has developed new approaches combining experimental deformation microstructural studies of the micro-scale processes, and modelling of these processes
for the study of earthquakes and geological reservoirs. She has reproduced seismic slip deformation conditions in the presence of pore fluids under controlled conditions, providing thus the experimental evidence of thermomechanical pressurisation of faults at seismic deformation conditions.

Awards and honors 
 Violay was awarded the 2017 Division Outstanding Early Career Scientist Award of the European Geoscience Union.
 She was awarded the Civil Engineering Institute Best Teacher award 2017 at EPFL

Selected publications

References

External links 
 
 Publication listed on ORCID
 Website of the Laboratory of Experimental Rock Mechanics LEMR

1984 births
Living people
Academic staff of the École Polytechnique Fédérale de Lausanne
University of Montpellier alumni
French civil engineers
21st-century French engineers